Gilbert Coursier (born in Cavaillon) was a French horn player.

Coursier studied at the Conservatoire de Paris with Jean Devemy. After winning the Geneva International Music Competition (CIEM), he was named first horn in the orchestra of the Théâtre national of the Opéra-Comique and the orchestra of the Paris Opera. He quickly embarked on an international career.

His most famous recording remains Joseph Haydn's Concerto for Two Horns in E flat with Georges Barboteu and the Jean-François Paillard chamber orchestra. This is the only recording in the phonographic history, as the technical difficulties are so difficult for both horns.

Coursier was married to the pianist Annie d'Arco.

References

External links 
 Coursier on Allmusic.com
 

Conservatoire de Paris alumni
French classical horn players
20th-century French musicians
People from Cavaillon
Date of birth unknown
Date of death unknown